KLER-FM (103.3 FM) is a radio station in the western United States, broadcasting an adult contemporary format in Orofino, Idaho. It is currently owned by Jeffery and Monica Jones, through licensee Central Idaho Broadcasting, Inc., and features programming from ABC Radio and Jones Radio Network.

On January 27, 2021, KLER-FM moved from 95.1 MHz to 103.3 MHz due to interference with KPND 95.3 in the Spokane area.

References

External links

LER-FM
Mainstream adult contemporary radio stations in the United States